Rollo is an unincorporated community in DeKalb County, Illinois, United States, located  east-southeast of Paw Paw.

History
A post office called Rollo was established in 1886, and remained in operation until it was discontinued in 1922. The community was named after the Rollo Books by Jacob Abbott.

References

Unincorporated communities in DeKalb County, Illinois
Unincorporated communities in Illinois